3:33 is a 2021 Indian Tamil-language psychological horror film written and directed by debutant Nambikkai Chandru and produced by Bamboo Trees Productions. The film stars Sandy, Gautham Vasudev Menon and Shruthi Selvam with a supporting cast including Saravanan, Reshma Pasupuleti, Rama and Mime Gopi. The film was released theatrically on 10 December 2021.

Cast 
 Sandy as Kathir
 Gautham Vasudev Menon as Paranormal investigator
 Shruthi Selvam
 Saravanan as Kathir's father
 Reshma Pasupuleti as Devi
 Mime Gopi as Exorcist
 Rama as Kathir's mother

Release 
The film released in theatres on 10 December 2021.

Reception 
Suganth of The Times of India gave a rating of 2.5 out on 5 and wrote, "The film then throws stuff like semi-evil numbers, mediums who communicate with ghosts and more scenes with Kathir [Sandy] that may or may not be bad dreams, but by then, the film stops being truly scary and turns exhausting." Behindwoods gave a rating of 2.5 out on 5 and wrote, "3:33 is a watchable horror thriller for Sandy's performance and the film's constant efforts to give the audience something new."

References

External links 
 

2021 directorial debut films
Indian horror films
2021 horror films
2020s Tamil-language films